is a Japanese musician, and the lead singer for the band Dreams Come True. She is also a founding member with bassist Masato Nakamura and keyboardist Takahiro Nishikawa.

Yoshida also fronts a Dreams Come True side-project, Funk the Peanuts, and has released two solo albums, Beauty and Harmony and Beauty and Harmony 2. Both albums took their name from the English translation of the name Miwa.

Life and music career 

In 2004, Yoshida married videographer Ken Sueda, who had shot several of Dreams Come True's Wonderland concert videos. Sueda died in 2007 of brain cancer, and it came out at the time that the marriage was never officially recorded.

In March 2012, she announced that she had married Juon Kamata, the lead singer of the Japanese rock band Fuzzy Control.

Discography

Singles 
  -m.yo mix- (6 May 2003)

Albums
 Beauty and Harmony (18 December 1995)
 Beauty and Harmony 2 (6 May 2003)

References

External links 
 

1965 births
Living people
Japanese women pop singers
Japanese women jazz singers
Musicians from Hokkaido
Dreams Come True (band)
20th-century Japanese women singers
20th-century Japanese singers
21st-century Japanese women singers
21st-century Japanese singers